William Arthur Ruble (March 11, 1903 – November 1, 1983) was a professional baseball player.  Nicknamed "Speed", he was an outfielder over parts of two seasons (1927, 1934) with the Detroit Tigers and Philadelphia Phillies.  For his career, he compiled a .207 batting average in 145 at-bats, with 19 runs batted in.

An alumnus of Maryville College, he was born in Knoxville, Tennessee and died in Maryville, Tennessee at the age of 80.

External links

1903 births
1983 deaths
Detroit Tigers players
Philadelphia Phillies players
Major League Baseball outfielders
Baseball players from Tennessee
Minor league baseball managers
Charlotte Hornets (baseball) players
Nashville Vols players
Seattle Indians players
Toledo Mud Hens players
Toronto Maple Leafs (International League) players
Minneapolis Millers (baseball) players
Oakland Oaks (baseball) players
Birmingham Barons players
Knoxville Smokies players
Oklahoma City Indians players
Maryville Scots baseball players
Newport Canners players